A timeline of United States inventions (after 1991) encompasses the ingenuity and innovative advancements of the United States within a historical context, dating from the Contemporary era to the present day, which have been achieved by inventors who are either native-born or naturalized citizens of the United States. Patent protection secures a person's right to his or her first-to-invent claim of the original invention in question, highlighted in Article I, Section 8, Clause 8 of the United States Constitution which gives the following enumerated power to the United States Congress:

In 1641, the first patent in North America was issued to Samuel Winslow by the General Court of Massachusetts for a new method of making salt. On April 10, 1790, President George Washington signed the Patent Act of 1790 (1 Stat. 109) into law which proclaimed that patents were to be authorized for "any useful art, manufacture, engine, machine, or device, or any improvement therein not before known or used." On July 31, 1790, Samuel Hopkins of Pittsford, Vermont became the first person in the United States to file and to be granted a patent for an improved method of "Making Pot and Pearl Ashes." The Patent Act of 1836 (Ch. 357, 5 Stat. 117) further clarified United States patent law to the extent of establishing a patent office where patent applications are filed, processed, and granted, contingent upon the language and scope of the claimant's invention, for a patent term of 14 years with an extension of up to an additional 7 years. However, the Uruguay Round Agreements Act of 1994 (URAA) changed the patent term in the United States to a total of 20 years, effective for patent applications filed on or after June 8, 1995, thus bringing United States patent law further into conformity with international patent law. The modern-day provisions of the law applied to inventions are laid out in Title 35 of the United States Code (Ch. 950, sec. 1, 66 Stat. 792).

From 1836 to 2011, the United States Patent and Trademark Office (USPTO) has granted a total of 7,861,317 patents relating to several well-known inventions appearing throughout the timeline below.

Contemporary era (1992–2009)

Post–Cold War and the mid-to-late 1990s (1992–1999)
1992 Spinner (wheel)
 A spinner is a type of hubcap that spins independently inside of a wheel itself when a vehicle is in motion, and continues to spin once the vehicle has come to a stop. As an attachment to the car's wheel, a spinner operates by using one or more roller bearings to isolate the spinner from the wheel, allowing it to turn while the wheel is at rest. The invention of the spinner is credited to James J.D. Gragg of Tulsa, Oklahoma who filed a patent on October 28, 1992 and was issued United States Patent #5,290,094 on March 4, 1994.

1994 CMOS image sensor

A CMOS image sensor (complementary metal-oxide semiconductor) is an image sensor consisting of an integrated circuit containing an array of pixel sensors, each pixel containing a photodetector and an active amplifier. Starting at the same point, they have to convert light into electrons by using the CMOS process. CMOS image sensors can be found in digital SLR cameras, embedded web-cams, video cameras, automotive safety systems, swallowable-pill cameras, toys and video games, and wireless video-security networks. The renowned American physicist and engineer Eric Fossum invented the CMOS image sensor while working at NASA's Jet Propulsion Laboratory in Pasadena, California. On January 28, 1994, Fossum filed U.S. patent #5,471,515, which was issued to him on November 28, 1995.

1994 DNA computing

DNA computing uses DNA, biochemistry and molecular biology, instead of the traditional silicon-based computer technologies. DNA computing, or, more generally, molecular computing, is a fast-developing interdisciplinary area. Research and development in this area concerns theory, experiments and applications of DNA computing. DNA computing is fundamentally similar to parallel computing in that it takes advantage of the many different molecules of DNA to try many different possibilities at once. Leonard Adleman of the University of Southern California initially pioneered this field in 1994. Adleman demonstrated a proof-of-concept use of DNA as a form of computation which solved the seven-point Hamiltonian path problem.

1994 Segway PT

The Segway PT is a two-wheeled, self-balancing, zero-emission, electric vehicle used for "personal transport". Segways have had success in niche markets such as transportation for police departments, military bases, warehouses, corporate campuses or industrial sites, as well as in tourism. The earliest patent resembling the modern Segway PT, U.S. patent #6,357,544, was filed on May 27, 1994 and issued to Dean Kamen on December 30, 1997. Kamen introduced his invention to the public in 2001.

1994 Quantum cascade laser

A quantum cascade laser is a sliver of semiconductor material about the size of a tick. Inside, electrons are constrained within layers of gallium and aluminum compounds, called quantum wells are nanometers thick, much smaller than the thickness of a hair. Electrons jump from one energy level to another, rather than moving smoothly between levels and tunnel from one layer to the next going "through" rather than "over" energy barriers separating the wells. When the electrons jump, they emit photons of light. The quantum cascade laser was co-invented by Alfred Y. Cho, Claire F. Gmachl, Federico Capasso, Deborah Sivco, Albert Hutchinson, and Alessandro Tredicucci at Bell Laboratories in 1994. On April 4, 1994, the Bell Labs team filed U.S. patent #5,457,709 that was issued on October 10, 1995.

1995 Bose–Einstein condensate
 A Bose–Einstein condensate (BEC) is a state of matter of bosons confined in an external potential and cooled to temperatures very near to absolute zero. Satyendra Nath Bose and Albert Einstein first conceptualized BEC  in 1924–1925; in 1995 Wolfgang Ketterle at MIT and Eric Cornell and Carl Wieman at the University of Colorado at Boulder National Institute of Standards and Technology Laboratory produced a BEC.

1995 Screenless hammer mill
 The screenless hammer mill, like regular hammer mills, is used to pound grain. The screenless hammer mill uses air flow to separate small particles from larger ones, rather than a screen, and is thus more reliable which results in much more energy efficiency. The screenless hammer mill was invented in 1995 by MIT professor and engineer Amy B. Smith.

1995 Scroll wheel
 A scroll wheel (or mouse wheel), a hard plastic or rubbery disc on a computer mouse, is used to scroll a pointer up or down on a computer display. It is perpendicular to the mouse surface and is normally located between the left and right mouse buttons. On December 16, 1998, Michelman filed the earliest patent for a scroll wheel, U.S. patent #6,940,488, which was later issued to him on September 6, 2005.

1995 JavaScript
 JavaScript, a scripting language widely used for client-side web development, became the originating dialect of the ECMAScript standard. It is a dynamic, weakly typed, prototype-based language with first-class functions. JavaScript was influenced by many languages and was designed to look like Java, but to be easier for non-programmers to work with. Brendan Eich invented JavaScript (which he called Mocha) in 1995; it later became renamed to LiveScript, and finally to JavaScript.

1996 Adobe Flash
 Adobe Flash is a multimedia platform created by Macromedia and currently developed and distributed by Adobe Systems. Since its introduction in 1996, Flash has become a popular method for adding animation and interactivity to web pages. Jonathan Gay wrote the Flash code in 1996 by  while in college and extended it while working for Silicon Beach Software and its successors.

1996 Bait car
 A bait car is a vehicle used by a law enforcement agency to capture car thieves. The vehicles are specially modified with features including GPS tracking and hidden cameras that record audio, video, time and date, which can all be remotely monitored by police. A remote-controlled immobilizer is installed in the vehicle that allows police to disable the engine and lock the doors. Jason Cecchettini invented the concept and technology in 1996.

1997 Virtual reality therapy
 Virtual Reality Immersion Therapy or VRIT is a method using specially encoded virtual environments and computers to evaluate and treat anxiety disorders such as acrophobia or PTSD. Conceived in the early 1990s by Dr. Ralph Lamson, VRIT was clinically proven and the key patent 6,425,764 was filed in 1997 for this major contribution to treatment of medical conditions involving sensory induced disorders by recreating such sensations in a controlled manner in an immersive virtual environment with feedback to achieve mastery over the causative sensations.

1998 HVLS fan
 An HVLS fan ("HVLS" stands for "high-volume low-speed") is a type of rotational mechanical fan that moves large amounts of circulating air. In addition, HVLS fans have been found to be more beneficial than traditional HVAC fans as they are more cost effective as well as having a stronger cooling effect while helping to maintain a constant temperature and humidity. Using 10 overhead airfoil blades in a barn, the HVLS fan was invented in 1998 by Walter Boyd who was challenged to find a better means to reduce the heat stress of dairy cattle which in turn, would increase milk production.

1999 Torino scale
 The Torino Scale, invented by Richard P. Binzel in 1999, is a method for categorizing the impact hazard associated with near-Earth objects (NEOs) such as asteroids and comets. It was intended as a tool for astronomers and the public to assess the seriousness of collision predictions, by combining probability statistics and known kinetic damage potentials into a single threat-value.

1999 Phase-change incubator
 The phase-change incubator is a low-cost, low-maintenance incubator to help test for microorganisms in water supplies. It uses small balls containing a chemical compound that, when heated and then kept insulated, will stay at 37 °C (approx. 99 °F) for 24 hours. MIT professor and engineer Amy B. Smith invented the phase-change incubator in 1999.

1999 Bowtie cotter pin
 A bowtie cotter pin is a formed wire fastener that resembles an R-clip, except it positively locks when installed. Rue S. Leitzke and Roman J. Baus first patented the bowtie cotter pin in 1999. U.S. patent #6,135,693 was filed on March 23, 1999 and issued to Leitzke and Baus on October 24, 2000.

1999 iBOT
 The iBOT is a stable and mobile powered wheelchair that balances on two of a total of six wheels. The iBOT is capable of climbing stairs as well as giving the user the ability to make eye-contact with a standing individual. Dean Kamen invented the iBOT in 1999. Kamen filed U.S. patent #6311794 on October 27, 1999 and later being issued on November 6, 2001.

1999 Camera phone
 The introduction of the camera phone in 1999 was an innovation that changed the daily lives of millions of people around the world. It allowed people to instantly take photos and videos, and dealt a major blow to the digital camera industry. It was invented by Toshiba

2000s decade
2001 iPod
 The iPod is a line of portable media players and multi-purpose pocket computers[2] designed and marketed by Apple Inc. The first version was released on October 23, 2001, about 8 1⁄2 months after the Macintosh version of iTunes was released. As of May 28, 2019, only the iPod Touch (7th generation) remains in production.

2002 SERF
 A spin-exchange relaxation-free (SERF) magnetometer achieves very high magnetic field sensitivity by monitoring a high density vapor of alkali metal atoms precessing in a near-zero magnetic field. SERF magnetometers are among the most sensitive magnetic field sensors and in some cases exceed the performance of SQUID detectors of equivalent size. The SERF magnetometer was invented by Michael V. Romalis at Princeton University in 2002.

2003 Fermionic condensate

A fermionic condensate is a superfluid phase formed by fermionic particles at low temperatures. The first atomic fermionic condensate was invented by Deborah S. Jin in 2003.

2003 Slingshot (water vapor distillation system)

 Slingshot is a portable water purification device powered by a stirling engine running on a combustible fuel source. The size of a dorm fridge, the Slingshot is claimed to be capable of turning any water source such as urine or saltwater into drinking water. Dean Kamen invented the Slingshot. Kamen filed U.S. patent # 7,340,879 on November 13, 2003 for the device which was issued on March 11, 2008.

2005 YouTube

 Born from the PayPal Mafia in 2005, YouTube is the world's most popular video sharing site. In 2006, Google bought YouTube for $1.65 billion. 
   
2006 Blu-ray Disc

 A digital optical disc data storage format. It was designed to supersede the DVD format, and is capable of storing several hours of video in high-definition.

2007 Nanowire battery

 A nanowire battery is a lithium-ion battery consisting of a stainless steel anode covered in silicon nanowires. Silicon, which stores ten times more lithium than graphite, allows a far greater energy density on a steel anode, thus reducing the mass of the battery. The high surface area further allows for fast charging and discharging. The practicality of nanowire batteries is reasoned that a laptop computer that runs on a regular lithium-ion battery for two hours could potentially operate up to 20 hours using a nanowire battery without recharging, which would be a considerable advantage for many people resulting in energy conservation and cost savings. The nanowire battery was co-invented in 2007 by Chinese-American Dr. Yi Cui, an assistant professor of materials science and engineering along with his colleagues at Stanford University.
2007 iPhone
 The iPhone is a line of smartphones designed and marketed by Apple Inc. All generations of the iPhone use Apple's iOS mobile operating system software. The first-generation iPhone was released on June 29, 2007, and multiple new hardware iterations with new iOS releases have been released since. 
2007 Amazon Kindle
 In 2007, Amazon released the original Amazon Kindle e-book reader. While not the first of its kind, the Kindle led the charge to popularizing e-books and e-readers.

2008 Bionic contact lens
 
 A bionic contact lens is a digital contact lens worn directly on the human eye which in the future, scientists believe could one day serve as a useful virtual platform for activities such as surfing the World Wide Web, superimposing images on real-world objects, playing video games for entertainment, and for monitoring patients' medical conditions. The bionic contact lens is a form of nanotechnology and microfabrication constructed of light emitting diodes, an antenna, and electronic circuit wiring. The bionic contact lens is the 2008 creation of Iranian-American Babak Parviz, an electrical engineer at the University of Washington (UW) in Seattle.

2009 3-D camera

 The world's first digital camera, Fujifilm, introduced a 3-D digital camera: the FinePix Real 3D W1. The 10-megapixel FinePix has two lenses, set about as far apart as human eyes, which snap shots of an object from slightly different angles. Those images are then combined into one, creating the illusion of depth. Its 3-D images can be viewed — without clumsy 3-D glasses — on the camera's back LCD screen or displayed in a special digital photo frame.

See also

Timelines of United States inventions
Timeline of United States inventions (before 1890)
Timeline of United States inventions (1890–1945)
Timeline of United States inventions (1946–1991)

Related topics
History of United States patent law
Lemelson Foundation
Lemelson–MIT Prize
List of African American inventors and scientists
List of Puerto Ricans
List of inventors
List of inventors killed by their own inventions
List of Puerto Ricans in the United States Space Program
Military invention
NASA spinoff
National Inventors Hall of Fame
Native American contributions
Science and technology in the United States
Technological and industrial history of the United States
Timeline of United States discoveries
United States Patent and Trademark Office
United States patent law
Yankee ingenuity

Footnotes

Further reading
 Deitch, Joanne Weisman, "A Nation of Inventors", Carlisle, Massachusetts : Discovery Enterprises Limited, 2001
 Haven, Kendall, "100 Greatest Science Inventions of All Time", Westport, Connecticut : Libraries Unlimited, 2006
 Hopping-Egan, Lorraine, "Inventors and Inventions", New York City, New York : Scholastic, Incorporated, 1997
 Ngeow, Evelyn, "Inventors and Inventions", New York City, New York : Marshall Cavendish Corporation, 2008
 Philbin, Tom, "The 100 Greatest Inventions of All Time", New York City, New York : Kensington Publishing Incorporated, 2003

External links
 American Inventors
 Google: U.S. Patents Search
 PBS: They Made America
 MIT: Invention Dimension
 NASA: Scientific and Technical Information: NASA Spinoff
 National Inventors Hall of Fame Foundation
 The Great Idea Finder
 United States Patent and Trademark Office

Timeline Of United States Inventions 1992
List of United States inventions and discoveries
United States
United States inventions
Inventions 1992